The 780th Military Intelligence Brigade conducts cyberspace operations to deliver effects in support of Army and Joint requirements. The 780th MI BDE is the only offensive cyberspace operations brigade in the U.S. Army.

Task Force Echo (TFE), a unit composed of U.S. Army National Guard (ARNG) Soldiers, was established on August 15, 2017. The 11th Cyber Battalion (11th CYB) activated on October 16, 2022.

See also
Military Intelligence Corps (United States Army)
United States Army Intelligence and Security Command
United States Army Cyber Command
Battlefield surveillance brigades in the United States Army – the United States Army is currently reorganizing its intelligence formations into Battlefield Surveillance Brigades (BfSB).

References 

Military intelligence brigades of the United States Army